Hard Believer is the sixth studio album by British band Fink. It was released globally by Ninja Tune's imprint R'COUP'D on 14 July 2014.

Promotion
"Looking Too Closely" was released as the lead single to promote the album on 8 July 2014. An official music video for the song, directed by Joffrey Jans and Kai Kurve (Wolf&Lamm Directors Duo), was released onto YouTube on 2 July 2014.

On 7 October 2014, a music video for the second single, "Shakespeare", premiered on YouTube. It was directed by Oliver Murray. An extended play containing remixes of the song will be released digitally on 13 October 2014.

Track listing

Personnel
Fink
Fin Greenall – lead and harmony vocals, acoustic guitars, keyboards
Guy Whittaker – electric and acoustic bass, BVs
Tim Thornton – drums, electric and acoustic guitars, BVs

Additional musicians
Ruben Hein – piano
Zac Rae – synths and effects

Chart performance

References

2014 albums
Fink (singer) albums
Ninja Tune albums